WKS Grunwald Poznań was an association football team as part of the wider sports club.

History
It was the first section to be created upon establishment of the club. Having spent the majority of its years in either the regional leagues or the third division, their highlights were reaching the 1st round of the 1966–67 and 1/16th of the 1975-76 Polish Cup losing 0–2 to Zagłębie Wałbrzych and Polonia Bytom respectively. After relegation from the third tier in 1985 the section was disbanded.

Notable players
Its most notable players were Walenty Czarnecki and Remigiusz Marchlewicz.

References

Bibliography
 
 
 

Association football clubs established in 1947
Association football clubs disestablished in 1985
Football clubs in Poznań
1947 establishments in Poland
1985 disestablishments in Poland
Defunct football clubs in Poland
Military association football clubs in Poland